Judith Melita Okely (born 1941) is a British anthropologist who is best known for her ethnographic work with the traveller gypsies of England. She is an Emeritus Professor of Social Anthropology, University of Hull and Research Affiliate of the School of Anthropology, University of Oxford. Her research interests encompass fieldwork practice, gypsies, feminism, autobiography, visualism, landscape representations, and the aged, mainly within Europe. The UK Data Service lists her as a "Pioneer of Social Research".

Early life and education 

Okely was born in Malta but grew up in Sussex and Lincolnshire. She attended boarding school from the age of nine at Upper Chine School for Girls on the Isle of Wight, but did not enjoy the experience, and later published work on the experience of girls in boarding schools.

She studied for two years at the Sorbonne in Paris and then enrolled at Oxford, where she began a campaign for the Oxford Union to admit women to their debating society. Admitting women to the Oxford Union required a 2/3 vote of its past and current members. The first vote failed, with 903 men voting to admit women and 435 voting against. The second vote, on 9 February 1963, succeeded, 1,039 to 427. Okely then became the first woman admitted to the Oxford Union.

While at Oxford, Okely read PPE at St Hilda's College of the University of Oxford, where she took a Certificate in Social Anthropology at the University of Cambridge (1970).

An appointment with the Centre for Environmental Studies in 1970 led to her research work on gypsy-travellers, and to a DPhil from Oxford in 1977 and her 1983 book.

Academic career
Okely was appointed as a lecturer at Durham University in 1976, moving to Essex in 1981, Edinburgh in 1990 and then becoming a Professor at  Hull in 1996. She retired from Hull in 2004, moving to become Deputy Director of the  International Gender Studies Centre, Queen Elizabeth House, and Research  Associate, School of Anthropology, University of Oxford.

Her 1983 book The Traveller-Gypsies was based on extensive field work with traveller-gypsies in the 1970s and was described as "an important contribution to the scientific, as opposed to the romantic or antiquarian approach, to the study of British Travellers" and "... not simply a work of scholarship however. It invites the public to understand in matters where prejudice and hostility have ruled. It deserves a wide readership".

Awards 
In 2011, she was awarded the Seal of the City of Pilsen in the Czech Republic, and also received a medal from the Faculty of Philosophy at Pilsen's University of West Bohemia, as a 'World Scholar.'

Selected publications
 1983 The Traveller-Gypsies, Cambridge, UK: Cambridge University Press.
1986 Simone de Beauvoir - A Re-reading. London: Virago Press. 
With Callaway, H. (eds) 1992 Anthropology and Autobiography: Participatory Experience and Embodied Knowledge, London: Routledge.
1996 Own or Other Culture, London, Routledge.
2007 Identity and Networks :Fashioning Gender and Ethnicity across Cultures  eds D. F. Bryeson, J.Okely and J.Webber  Oxford : Berghahn
2008 Knowing How to Know (eds) N. Halstead, E. Hirsch and J.Okely   Berghahn
2012 Anthropological Practice: fieldwork and the ethnographic method

References 

Living people
British women anthropologists
20th-century anthropologists
21st-century anthropologists
Social anthropologists
People educated at Ryde School with Upper Chine
Alumni of the University of Cambridge
Alumni of St Hilda's College, Oxford
Academics of Durham University
Academics of the University of Essex
Academics of the University of Edinburgh
Academics of the University of Hull
1941 births